Memsie, Aberdeenshire, is a small community near Fraserburgh, Scotland. On Memsie Moor there is a very large stone cairn, Memsie Cairn, which has been opened, but nothing found inside. There were two other cairns, but they have been removed. Apart from the cairn, Memsie is near Mormond Hill, which was a very large listening post in the Cold War. These days the former listening post is used for satellite communications.  The nearest Kirk to Memsie is in Rathen.

The House of Memsie is located east of the A981 to the south of the community.

References

Villages in Aberdeenshire